Sainte-Magnance is a commune in the Yonne department in Bourgogne-Franche-Comté in north-central France.

History 
The village was originally named Saint-Pierre-sous-Cordois.

In 448 bishop Germanus of Auxerre (380 - 448) died in Ravenna on the Adriatic coast. Magnance, a young woman from Ravenna accompanied his remains back to Auxerre, but she died on the way near the  Saint-Pierre-sous-Cordois village, in November 448. Her travelling companions buried her there. Then she was forgotten, until the 7th century when a pilgrim came to rest at the same spot, laying his head on a horse's skull. During his sleep he dreamed of Magnance protecting him from a snake. Upon awakening he found that there was a snake in the horse's skull. He told the story at the village. The inhabitants went and found Magnance's body, brought it back to the village, buried her in the church and renamed their village "Sainte-Magnance" in her honour. Her tomb is still in the village church.
In the 11th century a chapel was erected on the spot where she had died ; it was destroyed during the 18th century. In the 2000s (decade), a woman from the village made a donation to the village in her will, in order for a statue to be erected where the chapel had once stood. This was done in 2009. Her story is told on a sign accompanying the statue, which stands on the edge of a wood, on the side of the D906 road between Sainte-Magnance (Yonne) and Rouvray (Côte-d'Or). The D906 at this place is the limit between the two departments; the statue is in the Côte-d'Or side of the road but is very much linked with the Yonne village of Sainte-Magnance. 
There is easy parking nearby, and a plunging view from that spot onto Sainte-Magnance village at the bottom of the straight stretch of the old Roman road which is now the D906.

Environment 
Sainte-Magnance stands within the Morvan Regional Natural Park.

See also
Communes of the Yonne department

References

Communes of Yonne